Eremophila denticulata, also known as toothed eremophila, toothed poverty bush and Fitzgerald eremophila, is a flowering plant in the figwort family, Scrophulariaceae and is endemic to the south-west of Western Australia. It is an erect shrub with red flowers and leaves that have toothed margins.

Description
Young leaves are often very sticky.

The flower buds are orange-coloured but the open flower is bright red, rarely yellow. The petal tube is usually mostly covered with glandular hairs but the inside of the tube and the lower lobe have longer, softer hairs. The 4 stamens extend beyond the end of the petal tube.

Taxonomy and naming
The species was first formally described in 1859 by Ferdinand von Mueller in Fragmenta phytographiae Australiae.

In 2007, Robert Chinnock described two subspecies of E. denticulata and the names have been accepted by the Australian Plant Census:
Eremophila denticulata subsp. trisulcata Chinnock which has leaves that are smaller ( long) and fruit that have a blunt end.

The specific epithet is derived from the "Latin denticulata, finely dentate, very small teeth." The epithet trisulcata is derived from the "Latin trisulcata, three-furrowed".

Distribution
Eremophila denticulata subsp. denticulata occurs near Ravensthorpe. There is a record by "Black" in South Australia but this report has not been accepted. Eremophila denticulata subsp. trisulcata occurs near Mount Buraminya and Mount Ragged in the Cape Arid National Park.

Ecology
Eremophila denticulata is pollinated by birds. Subspecies trisulcata becomes rare in its range when not disturbed. After fire, the number of individual plants increases dramatically.

Conservation status
Both subspecies of Eremophila densifolia are classified as  "Threatened Flora (Declared Rare Flora — Extant)" by the Department of Environment and Conservation (Western Australia). An Interim Recovery Plan has been prepared for subspecies trisulcata.

Use in horticulture
Toothed poverty bush is well known in cultivation. It is suitable for larger gardens, especially where fast growth is required but is inclined to break branches in windy locations. It is difficult to propagate from seed but easily grown from cuttings. In high rainfall areas it is preferable to graft onto Myoporum species. It will grow well in most soils and is both drought and frost tolerant.

References

denticulata
Eudicots of Western Australia
Plants described in 1859
Endemic flora of Western Australia
Taxa named by Ferdinand von Mueller